Kathy is a feminine given name. It is a pet form of Katherine, Kathleen and their related forms. Kathy may refer to:

In sports
Kathy Bald (Born 1963), Canadian freestyle swimmer
Kathy May (Born 1956), American tennis player
Kathy Radzuweit (Born 1980), German volleyball player
Kathy Smallwood-Cook (Born 1962), British Olympic athlete
Kathy Sheehy (Born 1970), American water polo player
Kathy Tough (Born 1969), Canadian volleyball player
Kathy Watt (Born 1964), Australian female cycle racer
Kathy Weston (Born 1958), American middle distance runner
Kathy Foster (basketball) (Born 1960), Australian basketball player

In television and film
Kathy Bates (Born 1948), American actress and director
Kathy Burke (Born 1964), British actress
Kathy Garver, American television, stage, screen, and voice actress
Kathy Greenwood (Born 1962), Canadian comedian and actress
Kathy Griffin (Born 1960), American stand-up comedian
Kathy (TV series), a talk show hosted by Griffin
Kathy Hilton (Born 1959), American actress, celebrity and socialite
Kathy Long (Born 1964), American actress, kickboxer and mixed martial arts fighter
Kathy Staff (1928–2008), British actress born in Dukinfield, Cheshire, England, United Kingdom

In music
Kathy Foster (musician), American musician
Kathy Kirby (1938–2011), British singer 
Kathy Leander (Born 1963), Swiss singer
Kathy Linden (Born 1938), American pop singer
Kathy Mattea (Born 1959), American country singer
Kathy Valentine (Born 1959), American bassist for the all-girl pop band The Go-Gos
Kathy Young (Born 1945), American pop singer

In politics
Kathy Cox (born 1964), American politician
Kathy Hochul (born 1958), American politician
Kathy Stanton (active since 2000), Sinn Féin Member of the Northern Ireland Assembly in North Belfast
Kathy Sullivan (Australian politician) (born 1942), Australian politician
Kathy Whitmire (born 1946), American politician
Kathy Wolfe Moore (born 1957), American politician
Ahmed Kathrada (1929–2017), South African politician

In literature
Kathy Acker, American sex-positive feminist writer
Kathy Evans (1948–2003), English journalist and women's right activist
Kathy Jetnil-Kijiner, poet from Marshall Islands
Kathy Lette, (born 11 November 1958), British author
Kathy Shaidle, Canadian author, columnist, poet and blogger
Kathy Stinson, Canadian children's writer
Kathy Tyers, American author
Kathy Sierra, author of Head First programming tutorial series, blogger, and game developer

In fiction
Kathy Anderson, fictional character in the popular American TV and radio sitcom Father Knows Best
Kathy Barnes, fictional character in the long-running Channel 4 soap opera Hollyoaks
Kathy Carter, fictional character in the 1959-1964 Marvel comic book Kathy
Kathy Beale, fictional character in the British soap opera EastEnders
Kathy, fictional character from Barney & Friends played by Lauren King
Kathy Seldon, fictional character in the 1952 film Singin' in the Rain

In other fields
Kathy Butterly (Born 1963), American sculptor
Kathy Ireland (Born 1963), American model
Kathy Slade (born 1966), Canadian artist
Kathy Vivas (born 1972), Venezuelan astrophysicist

Songs about Kathy
Kathy's Song (disambiguation) 
"Kathy's Waltz" by The Dave Brubeck Quartet from the album Time Out
"Kathy with a K's Song" by Bright Eyes from the album Oh Holy Fools

Or see
Catherina (and similar spellings)

References

Given names
Feminine given names
English feminine given names